The 1880–81 Scottish Cup – officially the Scottish Football Association Challenge Cup – was the eighth season of Scotland's most prestigious football knockout competition. Defending champions Queen's Park retained the cup and won the competition for the fifth time after they beat Dumbarton 3–1 in a replayed final which saw Dr John Smith score the first Scottish Cup final hat-trick on 9 April 1881.

Calendar

As with the previous competitions, the eighth edition of the Scottish Cup took on the format of a traditional knockout tournament. For the earlier rounds, the names of competing teams were placed into lots according to their districts and drawn into pairs. The home team for each tie was determined by the toss of a coin unless it was mutually agreed or only one of the two clubs drawn against one another had a private ground. In the event of a draw, the team who lost the toss would have the choice of ground for the replay. A similar procedure was used for subsequent rounds however, any club which had received a bye in the previous round would first be drawn against one of the winners of the previous round. The names of winning teams were placed into one lot for later rounds. The choice of venue for the final matches was reserved to the Scottish Football Association.

Both Glasgow and Edinburgh Universities were given byes to the third round.

Teams
All 135 teams entered the competition in the first round.

First round
Glengowan, Hibernian, Lenzie, Possil Bluebell and Vale of Leven received a bye to the second round. Glasgow University and Edinburgh University received a bye to the third round.

Matches

Replays

Sources:

Second round
Cartside, Heart of Midlothian and Lenzie received a bye to the third round.

Matches

Replays

Sources:

Third round
Clarkston, Edinburgh University, Glasgow University and South Western received a bye to the fourth round.

Matches

Replay

Sources:

Fourth round
Thistle received a bye to the fifth round.

Matches

Replay

Notes

Sources:

Fifth round
Campsie Central received a bye to the quarter-finals.

Matches

Sources:

Quarter-finals

Matches

Sources:

Semi-finals
Queen's Park received a bye to the final.

Match

Sources:

Final

Original match

Replay

See also
1880–81 in Scottish football

References

1880–81
Cup
Scot